Kampong Telisai is a coastal village in Tutong District, Brunei, about  from the district town Pekan Tutong. The village also encompasses the public housing area STKRJ Kampong Telisai. The population was 2,293 in 2016. It is one of the villages within Mukim Telisai. The postcode is TC1145.

Facilities 
Tumpuan Telisai Primary School is the village primary school, whereas Tumpuan Telisai Religious School is the village school for the primary level of the country's Islamic religious primary education.

Kampong Telisai Mosque is the village mosque; it was inaugurated on 30 October 1984 and can accommodate 350 worshippers.

Tumpuan Telisai Recreational Park is a public beach recreational area on the village's coast with the South China Sea.

References 

Telisai